Agha Shahbaz Khan Durrani (died 25 June 2017) was a Pakistani politician and a member of Senate of Pakistan, affiliated with Pakistan Muslim League (N).
 Durrani become senator in March 2015 and would have ended his tenure in March 2021. He earned a Bachelor of Engineering from Balochistan University of Engineering and Technology Khuzdar in 2001. Agha Shahbaz Khan Durrani died due to cardiac arrest in Khuzdar, 25 June 2017.

References

20th-century births
2017 deaths
Pakistani senators (14th Parliament)
Pakistan Muslim League (N) politicians
People from Khuzdar District
Year of birth missing